Ronald Bon de Sousa Pernes (born 1940) is a Swiss-born Canadian philosopher and academic. He is an emeritus professor at the Department of Philosophy of the University of Toronto, which he joined in 1966.

Biography
De Sousa possesses both UK and Canadian citizenship. Educated in Switzerland and England, he took his B.A. at New College, Oxford University in 1962, and his Ph.D. at Princeton University in 1966. His thesis Categories, Translation, and Linguistic Theory was supervised by Paul Benacerraf.

He is best known for his work in philosophy of emotions, and has also made contributions to philosophy of mind and philosophy of biology. He was elected a fellow of the Royal Society of Canada in 2005.

Books 
 The Rationality of Emotion (1987)  (German translation 1997; Chinese translation 2006)
 Évolution et Rationalité (2004) 
 'Why think? Evolution and the Rational Mind' (2007) 
 Emotional Truth (2011) 
 Love: A Very Short Introduction (2015)

References

1940 births
Living people
Canadian philosophers
Fellows of the Royal Society of Canada
Academic staff of the University of Toronto
Alumni of New College, Oxford
Princeton University alumni
British expatriates in Switzerland
British emigrants to Canada
British expatriates in the United States
Presidents of the Canadian Philosophical Association